The Ancient and Honorable Order of Turtles ("International Association of Turtles", "Turtle Club", or similar title) started as an informal "drinking club" between American World War II pilots, self-described as "an honorable drinking fraternity composed of ladies and gentlemen of the highest morals and good character, who are never vulgar."

History of the Order 
According to Denis P. McGowan of the "Ancient and Honorable Order of Turtles", his father, the late Captain Hugh P. McGowan, U.S. Army Air Corps/U.S. Air Force Reserve (Ret.) and several pilots of the U.S. Army Air Corps 8th Air Force founded the Ancient and Honorable Order of Turtles in an officers' club while stationed in England during the Second World War: "We were flying daytime bombing missions over Hitler's Third Reich. We just wanted a little fun. We had seen a sign showing that the 'Ancient Order of Foresters' and the 'Royal Antediluvian Order of Buffaloes' would meet in the local pub, so I devised the name 'Ancient and Honorable Order of Turtles' for the fun of it. It was not meant to be serious, it had no constitution or by-laws, and was a relief from the horrors and dangers we saw every day on our missions. It spread after the War through the VFW and American Legion posts, and eventually, to Masonic groups, colleges and even to the high schools of the U.S.A."

Qualifying questions 
To gain admission, one must correctly answer a number (usually three or four) from a list of questions, each of which suggests a vulgar, lewd, or salacious answer, but the actual correct answer is rather innocuous. It is assumed that all prospective Turtles own a diabetic donkey, or one of a sweet and kindly disposition; therefore once inducted, a member must reply to the question "Are you a Turtle?" with "You bet your sweet ass I am." If the member is unable or unwilling (perhaps because of a social restriction on vulgarity) to provide the correct answer, he or she owes to each other turtle present a drink of the recipient's choice.
A large part of the tradition of the order involves the qualifying questions that prospective members have to answer. These fun questions are actually small riddles: each suggests a vulgar or lewd answer, but the candidate has to provide a completely innocuous answer.

A popular example would be the question:

The obvious answer to this question would be "pee" or "urinate", but the correct answer is "shake hands" (as western etiquette demands that a man needs to rise from his seat to shake hands, while a woman needs not).
 What does a cow have four of and a woman only two? (Legs)
 What is a four letter word ending in K that means to have intercourse? (Talk)
 What is it on a man that is round and hard, and sticks so far out of his pajamas that you can hang a hat on it? (Head)

A candidate must answer four from a list of twenty-five of such questions. While there is a traditional set of questions, some modern clubs also make up new initiation questions along the same lines.

Turtle Creed 
Members of the group were provided the "Turtle Creed" to carry in their wallet. The creed states:

The Creed is closed by the initials G.M.

Historical references 
During the 1962 Mercury-Atlas 8 mission (part of the United States space program), astronaut Wally Schirra was asked by a ground controller whether he was a turtle. Not wanting to use vulgar language while his communications were being broadcast worldwide, he temporarily stopped transmitting while he gave the required response "YBYSAIA".

Deke Slayton, a mere three minutes into Sigma 7s flight, came on the radio, which was open for everyone to hear, and asked, "Hey, Wally, are you a turtle?" Schirra switched his mic from live to record and uttered the appropriate response. On the open line, he said, "You bet."

Later, on board the recovery ship , in front of Slayton, Walt Williams and the other astronauts, Walt Williams demanded to know how Schirra replied to Deke's question. Schirra played the recorder. "Hey, Wally, are you a turtle?" followed by the proper response, "YBYSAIA". This incident is also recounted in Tom Wolfe's 1979 book The Right Stuff.

Wally Schirra's membership in the Ancient Order of Turtles came up again during Apollo 7, which was captured by the in-flight recorder:

CAPCOM radioed, "Just a minute, Wally. Let's see. Oh, it's a little message to Deke Slayton. A little bit closer Wally. Kind of looks like something about - 'Are you a, are you a—" Schirra acknowledged, "That's right." CAPCOM continued, "Looks like it says, 'Are you a turtle, Deke Slayton?"

Schirra confirmed, "That's right." Eisele added, "You get an A for reading today Jack." Swigert continued, "Here comes another one. Walt, oh, that-a-way, that's the way to turn it. It says, 'Paul Haney, are you a turtle?'" Cunningham radioed, "You'll get a gold star. Perfect score!" Swigert reported, "And there is no reply from Paul Haney there." Cunningham asked, "You mean he's speechless?"

A short while later, CAPCOM Cernan informed Schirra, "Wally, this is Gene. Deke just called in, and we've got your answer, and we've got it recorded for you return." Schirra acknowledged, "Roger. Real fine."

Shortly thereafter, Schirra asked CAPCOM Swigert, "Have you got Haney's answer yet?" Swigert replied, "No, Haney's isn't talking, Wally." Swigert then added, "Somebody tells me he isn't talking, but just buying." A pleased Schirra responded, "He is buying. Thank you very much. Very good."
This exchange about turtles was a reference to the notorious Turtle's Club drinking club of which Wally Schirra held the title of a Grand Potentate. During Schirra's Mercury flight Deke Slayton had radioed up to Schirra asking Schirra if he was a turtle.
A membership card for the "Interstellar Association of Turtles (Outer Shell Division)" signed by astronauts Scott Carpenter, Gordon Cooper and Wally Schirra sold at auction for $1,952 on May 5, 2011.

President Kennedy was allegedly asked if he was a Turtle at a press conference, to which he replied, "I'll buy you your drink later."

References in pop culture 
 In 1969, Dial Records released the 45rpm single "Are You a Turtle" by rock/soul group The Brotherhood, fronted by Ben Thayer. The single (Dial #4092) became a regional hit in the Southeast.
 In the 1975 three-novel collection The Illuminatus! Trilogy by Robert Shea and Robert Anton Wilson, references to the order are made various times including this one involving Lady Velkor: "Lady Velkor, wearing a green peasant blouse and green hotpants, looked around the geodesic KoolAid dome. A man in a green turtleneck sweater and green slacks caught her eye, and she walked over to him, asking, "Are you a turtle?" "You bet your sweet ass I am," he answered eagerly and so she had failed to make contact— and owed this oaf a free drink also. But she smiled pleasantly and concealed her annoyance."
 In the 1997 novel Timequake, Kurt Vonnegut tells John Hickenlooper (son of one of Vonnegut's fraternity brothers) of their asking for the password during "solemn and sacred occasion[s], such as the swearing in of new fraternity brothers."
 In the 2002 film Master of Disguise starring Dana Carvey, he says in a scene, "Am I not turtley enough for the turtle club?"
 On Dick Whittinghill's radio show on KMPC in Los Angeles, one of his recurring gags was a sound bite of someone asking, "Are you a turtle?"
 Imperial Turtle, Opie Craft, initiated George Carlin into the Turtle Club at a book signing in Arlington, VA. He loved the honor, replying with "Procure. I like that word."

References

External links 
 Turtle Club information
 World Turtle Order
 Resources for Turtles
 RUA Turtle? The Masonic Press Turtle Page
 Turtle Club US ios mobile app
 Turtle Club US Android mobile app

Drinking culture
Secret societies in the United States